The 2019 Vorarlberg state election was held on 13 October 2019 to elect the members of the Landtag of Vorarlberg.

The election was marked by major losses for the Freedom Party of Austria (FPÖ), with all other parties benefiting as a result. The Austrian People's Party (ÖVP) and Social Democratic Party of Austria (SPÖ) each improved their vote share for the first time since 2004, though the former failed to regain the absolute majority it had lost in 2014. The Greens moved into second place with a strong result of 18.9%. NEOS – The New Austria (NEOS) sought re-election to a Landtag for the first time and improved its performance to 8.5%.

The election took place just two weeks after the federal election in September, and was viewed as a boost to the prospect of an ÖVP–Green federal coalition, which would mirror the composition of the incumbent Voralberg government. The ÖVP–Green government under Governor Markus Wallner was renewed and took office in November.

Background
In the 2014 election, the ÖVP suffered major losses, primarily to the Greens and new party NEOS, and lost its majority. The party subsequently formed a coalition with the Greens.

Electoral system
The 36 seats of the Landtag of Vorarlberg are elected via open list proportional representation in a two-step process. The seats are distributed between four multi-member constituencies, corresponding to the districts of Vorarlberg. For parties to receive any representation in the Landtag, they must either win at least one seat in a constituency directly, or clear a 5 percent state-wide electoral threshold. Seats are distributed in constituencies according to the Hagenbach-Bischoff quota, with any remaining seats allocated at the state level, to ensure overall proportionality between a party's vote share and its share of seats.

Contesting parties
The table below lists parties represented in the previous Landtag.

In addition to the parties already represented in the Landtag, seven parties collected enough signatures to be placed on the ballot.

 Home to all Cultures (HAK)
 Xi – Future Opportunity (XI)
 The Change (WANDEL)
 WIR – Platform for Families and Child Protection (WIR)
 Men's Party (M)
 Christian Party of Austria (CPÖ)
 My Vote Counts! (GILT)

Result

Results by constituency

Aftermath
Governor Wallner held discussions with all parties before entering coalition talks with the Greens. They came to an agreement on 4 November, which was approved by both parties.

References

2019 elections in Austria
State elections in Austria
October 2019 events in Austria